Chinese Progressive Association can refer to one of two organizations:

 Chinese Progressive Association (Boston)
 Chinese Progressive Association (San Francisco)